OJSC Gazprom Space Systems, previously known as (Gazcom), is a Russian communications satellite operator and developer.

Overview
Gascom currently operates the Yamal telecommunication satellites, initially designed and built jointly with the Energia space corporation. The satellites are used to transmit over 60 Russian and foreign television channels, and are also used by the Defense, Nuclear Energy, and Education Ministries. The gas company Gazprom accounts for 17% of the use of Gascom's services. Government structures use 10%, corporate and commercial service providers 51%, and commercial television companies 22%.

Gascom experienced high growth rates in the early 21st century, with annual revenues growing from $5.5 million in 2000 to £32.6 million in 2005 and $83.7 million in 2008.

History
The company was founded in 1992 by several Gazprom Group enterprises (Yamburggazdobicha, Tumenburgaz, Urengoygazprom, Nadimgazprom, Tumentransgaz), as well as NPO Energia and Gazprombank.

See also
United Rocket and Space Corporation

References

External links
Company website

 
Aerospace companies of Russia
Spacecraft manufacturers
Space industry companies of Russia
Gazprom subsidiaries
Manufacturing companies established in 1992
Technology companies established in 1992
1992 establishments in Russia
Companies based in Moscow